Sir John Alexander David Aston is a British statistician, Chief Scientific Adviser (CSA) at the Home Office (2018-2020), and
Professor of Statistics, Statistical Laboratory, University of Cambridge. From 2021 he is the Harding Professor of Statistics in Public Life. And from July 2021 he has also served as a non-executive director on the board of the UK Statistics Authority.

Aston earned a bachelor's degree from the University of Cambridge, and a PhD in statistics from Imperial College London and McGill University in Montreal, Quebec.

Aston was an academic at the University of Warwick and at Academia Sinica in Taiwan, before becoming a professor at the University of Cambridge.

Aston was one of the 23 attendees of the Scientific Advisory Group for Emergencies (Sage) during the early stage of the SARS-CoV2 pandemic owing to his CSA role at the time.

Aston is married to Karri, and they have three children.

He was knighted in the 2021 Birthday Honours for services to statistics and public policymaking.

References

Living people
British statisticians
Alumni of the University of Cambridge
Alumni of Imperial College London
McGill University Faculty of Science alumni
Academics of the University of Warwick
Academics of the University of Cambridge
Year of birth missing (living people)
Place of birth missing (living people)
Knights Bachelor